Calochortus excavatus is a species of flowering plant in the lily family known by the common name Inyo County star-tulip.

Distribution
The flowering plant is endemic to eastern California, where it is known from several reduced and threatened populations in Mono and Inyo Counties. It occupies grassy habitats in alkaline Shadscale scrub plant communities, alongside Atriplex and other playa halophyte flora, primarily in Owens Valley.

The species is listed as endangered, threatened by the loss of local groundwater.

Description

The inflorescence bears 1 to 6 erect bell-shaped flowers in a close cluster. Each flower has three sepals which lack spotting, and three white petals. The petals may have green striping on their outer surfaces and generally have a red-purple blotch at the base. The anthers are reddish to purple.

See also

Shadscale scrub plant community
Saltbush scrub plant community

References

External links

USDA Plants Profile of Calochortus excavatus (Inyo County star-tulip)
Calochortus excavatus — Calphotos Photo gallery, University of California
California Native Plant Society, Bristlecone Chaper, Calochortus excavatus, “Inyo County Star-tulip”  photo and range iniformation

excavatus
Endemic flora of California
Flora of the California desert regions
Flora of the Great Basin
Natural history of Inyo County, California
Owens Valley